This is a list of law enforcement agencies in the state of North Dakota.

According to the US Bureau of Justice Statistics' 2008 Census of State and Local Law Enforcement Agencies, the state had 114 law enforcement agencies employing 1,324 sworn officers, about 206 for each 100,000 residents.

State agencies
North Dakota Bureau of Criminal Investigation
North Dakota Department of Corrections and Rehabilitation
North Dakota Game and Fish Department
North Dakota Highway Patrol
North Dakota State Fire Marshal
North Dakota Parks and Recreation Department

County agencies

Adams County Sheriff's Office
Barnes County Sheriff's Office
Benson County Sheriff's Office
Billings County Sheriff's Office
Bottineau County Sheriff's Office
Bowman County Sheriff's Office
Burke County Sheriff's Office
Burleigh County Sheriff's Office
Cass County Sheriff's Office
Cavalier County Sheriff's Office
Dickey County Sheriff's Office
Divide County Sheriff's Office
Dunn County Sheriff's Office
Eddy County Sheriff's Office
Emmons County Sheriff's Office
Foster County Sheriff's Office
Golden Valley County Sheriff's Office
Grand Forks County Sheriff's Office

Grant County Sheriff's Office
Griggs County Sheriff's Office
Hettinger County Sheriff's Office
Kidder County Sheriff's Office
Lamoure County Sheriff's Office
Logan County Sheriff's Office
McHenry County Sheriff's Office
McIntosh County Sheriff's Office
McKenzie County Sheriff's Office
McLean County Sheriff's Office
Mercer County Sheriff's Office
Morton County Sheriff's Office
Mountrail County Sheriff's Office
Nelson County Sheriff's Office
Oliver County Sheriff's Office
Pembina County Sheriff's Office
Pierce County Sheriff's Office
Ramsey County Sheriff's Office

Ransom County Sheriff's Office
Renville County Sheriff's Office
Richland County Sheriff's Office
Rolette County Sheriff's Office
Sargent County Sheriff's Office
Sheridan County Sheriff's Office
Sioux County Sheriff's Office
Slope County Sheriff's Office
Stark County Sheriff's Office
Steele County Sheriff's Office
Stutsman County Sheriff's Office
Towner County Sheriff's Office
Traill County Sheriff's Office
Walsh County Sheriff's Office
Ward County Sheriff's Office
Wells County Sheriff's Office
Williams County Sheriff's Office

City agencies 

 Ashley Police Department
 Belfield Police Department
 Beulah Police Department
 Bismarck Police Department
 Bowman Police Department
 Burlington Police Department
 Cando Police Department
 Carrington Police Department
 Casselton Police Department
 Cavalier Police Department
 Center Police Department
 Cooperstown Police Department
 Crosby Police Department
 Devils Lake Police Department
 Dickinson Police Department
 Elgin Police Department
 Ellendale Police Department
 Emerado Police Department
 Fargo Police Department
 Fessenden Police Department
 Grafton Police Department

 Grand Forks Police Department
 Harvey Police Department
 Hazen Police Department
 Hillsboro Police Department
 Jamestown Police Department
 Kenmare Police Department
 Killdeer Police Department
 Kulm Police Department
 Lamoure Police Department
 Larimore Police Department
 Lincoln Police Department
 Linton Police Department
 Lisbon Police Department
 Mandan Police Department
 Mayville Police Department
 Medora Police Department
 Milnor Police Department
 Minot Police Department
 Mohall Police Department
 Napoleon Police Department
 New Town Police Department

 Northwood Police Department
 Oakes Police Department
 Parshall Police Department
 Powers Lake Police Department
 Rolla Police Department
 Rugby Police Department
 St. John Police Department
 Scranton Police Department
 Sherwood Police Department
 South Heart Police Department
 Stanley Police Department
 Steele Police Department
 Surrey Police Department
 Tioga Police Department
 Thompson Police Department
 Valley City Police Department
 Wahpeton Police Department
 Watford City Police Department
 West Fargo Police Department
 Williston Police Department
 Wishek Police Department

College and university agencies 
 University of North Dakota Police Department
 North Dakota State University Police Department
 North Dakota State College of Science Police

Cross-jurisdiction agencies
 South East Multi-County Agency Narcotics Task Force (SEMCA)

References

North Dakota
Law enforcement agencies of North Dakota
Law enforcement agencies